"Silly Ho" is a song recorded by American girl group TLC for their third studio album FanMail (1999). The song was written and produced by TLC's long-time collaborator Dallas Austin under his artificial intelligence alter ego pseudonym named Cyptron. Instead of Lisa "Left Eye" Lopes's vocals being on the song due to a busy schedule, Vic-E, the then temporary voice-based fourth member for the group's FanMail era, makes an appearance on the rap verse and provides ad-libs.

The song was sent to radio stations as a promotional single prior to the release of FanMail and reached number twenty-one on the Billboard Hot R&B/Hip-Hop Songs chart. The song also peaked at number fifty-nine on the Hot 100. "Silly Ho" received mixed reviews from music critics, who complimented the track itself while criticizing its misleading feminist lyrics.
It also featured on several compilation albums.

Composition
"Silly Ho" is a R&B-techno song that built on a foundation of "annoying sonic" burrs and "cutesy chop-suey" synths. The song along with "I'm Good At Being Bad" were said to crank up the "raunch level" for the girls. Two authors Kerry Mallan and Sharyn Pearce analyzed its content in their book Youth Cultures: Texts, Images, and Identities:

With the lyrics: ”I ain’t never been no silly bitch/Waiting to get rich/From a nigga bank account,” which David Browne from Entertainment Weekly points out they were talking about taking control of their own finances. However, Complex Julianne Escobedo Shepherd said the track's message was one of total independence, "and not playing one's self out to sit at the feet of a dude." Jet agreed, the publication noticed the song's similar message to "No Scrubs", but more about "a kind of female who can't get her life together." Vic-E then raps "You know you can't get with this.../ Stuck on silly shit/ Boy you know you need to quit" before declaring "[she's] out" on the bridge of the song.

Critical reception

David Browne from Entertainment Weekly said the song could be a jingle for "a hip-hop investment firm." Kelefa Sanneh described it as, "a startling single, which I loved: a violent buzzing sound interrupted every few lines, as if the producer, Dallas Austin, were playing a prank".

In a retrospective review by Complex Julianne Escobedo Shepherd, she said Austin was doing his best Timbaland imitation of Aaliyah's "Are You That Somebody?" on the track. Billboard Chuck Taylor also compared the two songs, questioning whether the song is a throwaway track to stir interest before knowing if they have made any true progress. Ann Powers from Rolling Stone, however, criticized Austin's attempt at girl power on the song as "misguided." 

Positively, Robert Christgau and The A.V. Club Nathan Rabin both chose the song as one of Fanmail best tracks. Similarly, Jonathan Bernstein from Spin predicted the track to be a "future hit".

Release and commercial performance
The song was the first song and promotional single released off their album as a teaser for FanMail. Both the song and "No Scrubs" have gotten "tremendous" airplay.

American musician Girl Talk took samples of the song for his mash-up track "All Eyes on Me" on the album Unstoppable (2004). In 2016, Canadian producer Jåmvvis covers the song with a new jazz-influenced, sax-heavy, bass driven redition.

Live performances
On June 22, 2013, TLC includes the track on their hits medley while performing at the 2013 MTV Video Music Awards Japan, receiving the Legend Award.

Silly Ho/Hat 2 Da Back/Kick Yo Game (Super Bowl Blitz '14)

Formats and track listings

Promotional US CD
 "Silly Ho"  – 4:15
 "Silly Ho"  – 4:15
 "Silly Ho"  – 0:10

Promotional US 12" vinyl
 "Silly Ho"  – 4:16
 "Silly Ho"  – 4:16
 "Silly Ho"  – 4:16
 "Silly Ho"  – 4:16

Charts

Year-end charts

References

1998 singles
Songs written by Dallas Austin
Song recordings produced by Dallas Austin
TLC (group) songs